1983 Emperor's Cup Final was the 63rd final of the Emperor's Cup competition. The final was played at National Stadium in Tokyo on January 1, 1984. Nissan Motors won the championship.

Overview
Nissan Motors won their 1st title, by defeating Yanmar Diesel 2–0. Nissan Motors was featured a squad consisting of Makoto Sugiyama, Shinobu Ikeda, Takeshi Koshida, Shinji Tanaka, Hidehiko Shimizu, Kazushi Kimura, Takashi Mizunuma, Koichi Hashiratani and Nobutoshi Kaneda.

Match details

See also
1983 Emperor's Cup

References

Emperor's Cup
1983 in Japanese football
Yokohama F. Marinos matches
Cerezo Osaka matches